List of Mayors of Raritan Township and Edison Township, New Jersey, United States. The township was renamed from Raritan to Edison in November 1954.

References